John Tweedale (June 10, 1841 – December 21, 1920) was a Union Army soldier during the American Civil War and a recipient of America's highest military decoration the Medal of Honor for his actions at the Battle of Stones River.

Post war
Tweedale received a LL.B. degree from Columbian University (now George Washington University) of Washington, D.C. in 1868.  After receiving his commission in the Army, he became Chief Clerk of the War Department. and confirmed by Congress on April 27, 1904, as Assistant Adjutant General with the rank of lieutenant colonel.  He retired June 10, 1905 with the rank of colonel.

Tweedale was buried at Arlington National Cemetery, Arlington, Virginia, Plot: Section 1, Lot 470.

Medal of Honor citation

Rank and Organization: Private, Company B, 15th Pennsylvania Cavalry.
Place and date: At Stones River, Tenn., December 31, 1862 to January 1, 1863.
Entered service at: Philadelphia, Pa.
Born: June 10, 1841, Frankford, Pa.
Date of issue: November 18, 1887.

Citation:
 Gallantry in action.

See also

 List of Medal of Honor recipients
 List of American Civil War Medal of Honor recipients: T–Z

Notes

1841 births
1920 deaths
United States Army Medal of Honor recipients
Burials at Arlington National Cemetery
George Washington University Law School alumni
People of Pennsylvania in the American Civil War
Union Army officers
American Civil War recipients of the Medal of Honor